Fengshun East railway station is a railway station in Fengshun County, Meizhou, Guangdong, China. It is an intermediate stop on the Meizhou–Chaoshan high-speed railway. It opened with the line on 11 October 2019.

See also
Fengshun railway station

References 

Railway stations in Guangdong
Railway stations in China opened in 2019